Pierre Planus (born March 25, 1979 in Bordeaux) is a French midfielder.

External links 
 

1979 births
Living people
French footballers
FC Girondins de Bordeaux players
US Créteil-Lusitanos players
Paris FC players
Angers SCO players
Entente SSG players
Trélissac FC players
Association football midfielders